Du Wenhui is a versatile Chinese football player able to play in numerous attacking positions.

Club career
Originally starting his youth career at Beijing Guoan his performances were impressive enough for Eintracht Frankfurt to take him into their youth team. Du Wenhui however would return to Beijing Guoan to start his professional senior career in the 2001 season. He has since continued to play for Beijing Guoan throughout his career, though he mainly plays as a striker he has had to often sacrifice his position to the numerous foreign strikers who have played for the team or play out of position. Despite rarely playing in his favoured position his versatility in attack has always meant that he remains a consistent regular within the team and this would help Beijing win the 2009 Chinese Super League title.

In January 2011, Du transferred to top tier side Jiangsu Sainty and in his debut season he would be part of the team that finished in Jiangsu's highest ever league finish of fourth.

International career
Du Wenhui would start his international career on February 7, 2007 in a friendly against Kazakhstan in a 2-1 win where he came on as a substitute for Li Jinyu. He would go on to make several further friendly appearances, however all were as a substitute and he failed to gain a regular place within the team.

Honours
Beijing Guoan
Chinese Super League: 2009
Chinese FA Cup: 2003

References

External links
 
 Player stats at Football-Lineups.com
 Player stats at Sohu.com

1983 births
Living people
Chinese footballers
Footballers from Beijing
China international footballers
Expatriate footballers in Germany
Eintracht Frankfurt players
Beijing Guoan F.C. players
Jiangsu F.C. players
Hunan Billows players
Hebei F.C. players
Chinese Super League players
China League One players
Association football forwards